"Lightning Crashes" is a song by American rock band Live. It was released in September 1994 as the third single from their second studio album, Throwing Copper. Although the track was not released as a single in the United States, it received enough radio airplay to peak at  12 on the Billboard Hot 100 Airplay chart in 1995. The song also topped the Billboard Album Rock Tracks chart for 10 weeks and the Modern Rock Tracks chart for nine weeks. Internationally, the song reached No. 3 in Canada, No. 8 in Iceland, and No. 13 in Australia.

Song meaning
The band dedicated the song to a high-school friend, Barbara Lewis, who was killed by a drunk driver in 1993. Lead singer Ed Kowalczyk said, "I wrote 'Lightning Crashes' on an acoustic guitar in my brother's bedroom shortly before I had moved out of my parents' house and gotten my first place of my own." Kowalczyk says that the video for "Lightning Crashes" has caused misinterpretations of the song's intent.
While the clip is shot in a home environment, I envisioned it taking place in a hospital, where all these simultaneous deaths and births are going on, one family mourning the loss of a woman while a screaming baby emerges from a young mother in another room. Nobody's dying in the act of childbirth, as some viewers think. What you're seeing is actually a happy ending based on a kind of transference of life.
New York magazine described the band as "deeply mystical" and claimed that the song was, "The story of a...connection between an old lady dying and a new mother at the moment of giving birth."
Just a few years before, Kowalczyk discovered the writings of Indian spiritualist Jiddu Krishnamurti, whose philosophy of living life from a place of selflessness and humility influenced the singer’s songwriting process, as well as the band’s creative philosophy.

Composition
The song is written in the key of C major but recorded a half step lower in B major.

Track listings
All songs were written by Live.

Australian CD single
 "Lightning Crashes" (edit) – 4:24
 "The Dam at Otter Creek" (bootleg) – 5:35
 "Selling the Drama" (bootleg) – 3:35

European CD single
 "Lightning Crashes" (edit) – 4:26
 "Lightning Crashes" (live at Glastonbury '95) – 5:21

European maxi-CD single
 "Lightning Crashes" (edit) – 4:26
 "Lightning Crashes" (live at Glastonbury '95) – 5:21
 "The Beauty of Gray" (bootleg, live on tour in late 1994) – 4:43

UK CD1
 "Lightning Crashes" – 5:25
 "The Beauty of Gray" (bootleg version, live on tour in late 1994) – 4:44
 "T.B.D." (acoustic version) – 3:49

UK CD2
 "Lightning Crashes" – 5:25
 "Lightning Crashes" (live at Glastonbury '95) – 5:16
 "White, Discussion" (live at Glastonbury '95) – 5:22

UK cassette single
 "Lightning Crashes" – 5:25
 "Lightning Crashes" (live at Glastonbury '95) – 5:16

Charts

Weekly charts

Year-end charts

Release history

In popular culture
"Lightning Crashes" was used at the end of episode 3 of Strange Luck, "Last Chance" It was also used at the beginning of the season 4 finale of One Tree Hill.

References

External links
 Official band website
 

1994 singles
1994 songs
Live (band) songs
Music videos directed by Jake Scott (director)
Radioactive Records singles
Song recordings produced by Jerry Harrison
Songs about death